Chuchkovo is a rural locality (a village) and the administrative center of Chuchkovskoye Rural Settlement, Sokolsky District, Vologda Oblast, Russia. The population was 307 as of 2002. There are 6 streets.

Geography 
Chuchkovo is located 88 km northeast of Sokol (the district's administrative centre) by road. Slobodishchevo is the nearest rural locality.

References 

Rural localities in Sokolsky District, Vologda Oblast
Totemsky Uyezd